Kietlin may refer to the following places in Poland:
Kietlin, Lower Silesian Voivodeship (south-west Poland)
Kietlin, Łódź Voivodeship (central Poland)